Shushan Prison is a prison in Hefei, Anhui, China. It was established in 1955. As in June 2006 it employed 300 police and held 1,500 inmates serving sentences of 10–20 years.

See also
List of prisons in Anhui

References

Laogai Research Foundation Handbook

Prisons in Anhui
1955 establishments in China
Buildings and structures in Hefei